Morris Dempson Busby (born March 15, 1938) is an American career diplomat who served as United States Ambassador to Colombia from 1991 to 1994, during which Pablo Escobar was killed.

Career 
Before being appointed as the United States Ambassador to Colombia, Busby served as coordinator for counter-terrorism with the rank of Ambassador at the Department of State in Washington, D.C. Prior to this, he served at the Department of State as a special envoy for Central America, 1988–1989; Principal Deputy Assistant Secretary of State for Inter-American Affairs, 1987–1988; and Director of the Nicaraguan Coordination Office, 1987.

Busby served as deputy chief of mission at the United States Embassy in Mexico City, 1984–1987; and as an Alternate United States Representative to the Committee on Disarmament at the United States mission in Geneva, Switzerland, 1981–1984.

On May 15, 1991 President George H. W. Bush nominated Busby to be United States Ambassador to Colombia. On July 30, 1991, the U.S. Senate made the confirmation.

During his tenure, on December 2, 1993 the leader of the Medellín Cartel, Pablo Escobar was shot and killed by Colombian National Police. After Escobar's death, Busby announced on national television: "Pablo Escobar's death and the dismantling of the Medellin cartel are great successes for Colombia. But now they should continue with the Cali Cartel.".

After being Ambassador, in 1995 he has served as President of BGI, Inc., an international consulting firm. Busby became Director of Morpho Detection, Inc. since March 1998.

References

External links

|-

1938 births
People from Memphis, Tennessee
Ambassadors of the United States to Colombia
Living people
Marshall University alumni
George Washington University alumni